The Manitoba Historical Society is a historical society in the province of Manitoba, Canada.  It was created in 1879 by an act of the Legislative Assembly of Manitoba, and describes itself as "the oldest organization in western Canada devoted to the promotion of public interest in, and preservation of, the region’s historical resources".  The society publishes a journal called Manitoba History and presents an annual literary award called the Margaret McWilliams Award. The current president of the society is Gordon Goldsborough.

Notable people
 William Kennedy, a founder
 H. Clare Pentland (President from 1963-65)

References

External links
 

Non-profit organizations based in Manitoba
Historical societies of Canada
Organizations established in 1879
1879 establishments in Manitoba